General Lucio Blanco International Airport, also known as Reynosa International Airport, is an international airport located in Reynosa, Tamaulipas, Mexico, near the Mexico–United States border. It handles national and international air traffic for the city of Reynosa.

In 2020, the airport handled 229,058 passengers, and in 2021, it handled 425,918 passengers.

The airport is named in honor of General Lucio Blanco, a major figure of the Mexican Revolution from 1910 to 1920.

In 2000, Aeroméxico Flight 250 overran the runway and crashed. Four people on the ground were killed.

Airlines and destinations

Passengers

Cargo

Statistics

Passengers

See also 

 List of the busiest airports in Mexico

References

External links
 Grupo Aeroportuario Centro Norte de México
 Aeropuerto de Reynosa

Airports in Tamaulipas
Reynosa